Just B is a South Korean boy band formed by Bluedot Entertainment. The group consists of six members: Geonu, Bain, Lim Ji-min, JM, DY, and Sangwoo.

History

Pre-debut
DY and Bain were former contestants on MBC's survival show Under Nineteen.  DY won first place and made his debut as the center of 1the9 while Bain was eliminated in the final episode. 

Lim Ji-min was a former contestant on SBS' The Fan, but was eliminated. He made his solo debut with his single album Mini.

Geonu and JM were former contestants on Mnet's survival show I-Land. JM was eliminated in the first part, while Geonu was eliminated in the second part of episode 8.

2021: Debut with Just Burn and Just Beat
On June 30, Just B officially debuted with the release of their first extended play Just Burn and the lead single "Damage" was produced by Bang Yong-guk, a singer, rapper, songwriter and producer who was the leader of the boy group B.A.P.

On October 27, Just B made their comeback with their first single album Just Beat and its lead single "Tick Tock".

2022–present: Just Begun and = (Neun)
On April 12, 2022, Just B released their second extended play Just Begun and its lead single "Re=load". Just B released their third extended play = (Neun) and its lead single "Me=" on November 16, 2022.

Members
Adapted from their Naver profile and official website.
 Geonu (건우)
 Bain (배인)  
 Lim Ji-min (임지민)
 JM (추지민)
 DY (전도염)
 Sangwoo (상우)

Discography

Extended plays

Single albums

Singles

Videography

Music videos

Awards and nominations

References 

Kakao M artists
K-pop music groups
Musical groups established in 2021
South Korean boy bands
South Korean pop music groups
South Korean dance music groups
Musical groups from Seoul
2021 establishments in South Korea